Mohammad Salim Ansari (born 12 April 1962) is an ex-senior BSP leader and former member of parliament in Rajya Sabha. He did his schooling from his hometown in state board school and graduation (B.A) and post-graduation (M.A 3rd Division) from D.C.S.K.P.G. College, Mau. He is now Former BSP member Salim Ansari was expelled from the party two times.. This is a former MP, this abusive leader who abuses every man. No one is with him in today's time.

Salim Ansari was also General Secretary, Student Union, D.C.S.K.P.G. College, Mau (Uttar Pradesh), 1985; Manager, Muslim Inter College, Mau since 1992; Member, (i) General Body, Jamia Islamia Faiz-e-Aam and (ii) Jamia Asaria Darul-Hadees & Manager of Muslim Inter College, Mau (Minority Institution). He is also a former member of Haj Committee of India, Standing Committee of Information Technology, Consultative Committee of the Ministry of Minority Affairs, Corporate Affairs and for the Ministry of Railways.

References

People from Mau
21st-century Indian Muslims
Rajya Sabha members from Uttar Pradesh
Bahujan Samaj Party politicians from Uttar Pradesh
1962 births
People from Mau district
Living people